Cicely Waite-Smith (née Howland) (1910–1978) is a Jamaican playwright and short story writer.

Early life 
Cicely Howland was born in Canada in 1910. She studied in Europe - namely England, Switzerland and France. Having returned back to England, Howland tried herself as an actress. She left acting when she married a Jamaican - Frank Waite-Smith. 

Waite Smith was invited to a 1957 Belize Festival of Arts drama section as an adjudicator.

Works
The Wild Horse, 1955
The Impossible Situation, 1956 
Africa Sling-shot, 1958 
Return to paradise, 1966
The Creatures
Family poem

References

External links 
 LC Linked Data Service: Authorities and Vocabularies (Library of Congress)

 Obituary: Errol Hill
 Chezia Thompson Cager, Maryland Institute College “Mothering the Patriarchy: Resistance and Acculturation in the Plays of Jamaican Playwright-Cicely Waite-Smith”

1910 births
1978 deaths
Jamaican women short story writers
Jamaican women dramatists and playwrights
20th-century short story writers
20th-century dramatists and playwrights
20th-century Jamaican women writers
20th-century Jamaican writers